is a 1964 Japanese film directed by Toshio Masuda. Inspired by Yujiro Ishihara's  hit song of the same title.

Plot
Mikami was deceived by his friend and colleague detective Ishizuka, but he didn't know the fact and was forced to quit the job, and left Yokohama. But one day he heard from a person that the reason he had to quit the job was by Ishizuka's  deceiving. and he wanted to solve the riddle.
Mikami returns to Yokohama again and knows that Ishizuka is now a businessman and was married to his former lover. Now Ishizuka tries to murder Mikami.

Cast
 Yūjirō Ishihara as Jirō Mikami
 Ruriko Asaoka as Reiko Hiraoka
 Hideaki Nitani as  Takeshi Ishizuka
 Tamio Kawachi as Seiji
 Shinsuke Ashida as Morita
 Nobuo Kaneko as Tsuchiya
 Yoko Yamamoto as Maid
 Reiko Sasamori as Mitsuko
 Masao Shimizu

References

External links

Nikkatsu films
1960s Japanese films